Ousley is an unincorporated community in Lowndes County, in the U.S. state of Georgia.

History
The community was named after Joseph and William H. Ousley, pioneer citizens. A post office called Ousley was established in 1866, and remained in operation until 1954.

References

Unincorporated communities in Lowndes County, Georgia